Randy Asbury (born October 4, 1958) is a Republican former member of the Missouri House of Representatives. Asbury represents the 22nd District, encompassing all or parts of Chariton, Macon, and Radolph counties. He was first elected to the Missouri House in 2010.

Personal history
Randy Asbury was born and raised in Fayette, Missouri. After graduation from Fayette High School in 1976, he attended the University of Missouri, earning a Bachelor of Science-Agriculture degree in 1980. Among his jobs prior to becoming State Representative were co-owner and President of the farm supply business Soil Technologies of Missouri. He has also worked for the Missouri Pork Producers Association and Soaring Eagles Ministries, a ministry for homeless persons. Randy Asbury is a former Deputy Director for the Missouri Department of Agriculture as well. Asbury is the current executive director for the Coalition to Protect the Missouri River (CPR). He and wife Connie are the parents of four children.

Political history
Randy Asbury ran as a Republican candidate for Governor of Missouri in the 2016 election. In 2000, Randy Asbury was a candidate for the 19th District seat in the Missouri Senate, defeating fellow Republicans Frank A. Martin and G.W. Parker Jr. in the August primary, but losing to Democrat Ken Jacob by a wide margin in the November general election. Missouri Governor Matt Blunt appointed Randy Asbury to finish an unexpired term on the Randolph County Commission. Asbury ran for the 22nd District Missouri State Representative seat in 2010 beating Tim Remole and Doug Farnen in the Republican primary, then defeating Doug Galaske in the November general election to succeed the term-limited Therese Sander.

Legislative assignments
Rep. Asbury will serve on the following commissions during the 96th General Assembly:
 Appropriations - Agriculture and Natural Resources subcommittee
 Budget
 Vice-Chairman, Emerging Issues in Animal Agriculture
 Local Government

References

1958 births
Baptists from Missouri
Living people
Republican Party members of the Missouri House of Representatives
People from Fayette, Missouri
People from Randolph County, Missouri
University of Missouri alumni
21st-century American politicians
Candidates in the 2016 United States elections